Bertha González Nieves (born May 6, 1970, Mexico City, Mexico) is a Mexican businesswoman, whose career is rooted in the consumer luxury goods market.

Forbes has identified her as one of the 50 most powerful women in Mexico. She has also been named one of Mexico's top young businesswomen by Revista Expansión, Mexico's leading business magazine. Her career has had an emphasis on the tequila industry. She is the first woman to be certified as ‘Maestra Tequilera’ by the Academia Mexicana de Catadores de Tequila, the organization recognized by The Tequila Regulatory Council  (CRT).

Present
Bertha González Nieves is currently Co-Founder & CEO of Casa Dragones Tequila Company, a handcrafted, limited edition tequila brand which she co-founded with businessman and founder of MTV Bob Pittman. Casa Dragones is a 100% Blue Agave Joven tequila, handcrafted in small batches in Jalisco Mexico, and considered a sipping tequila.

González Nieves has established herself as a thought leader in the modern tequila industry. In the March 8, 2018 issue of The New York Times, she explained that the tequila industry is a "growth industry that could further enrich her country culturally and economically." She also spends much of her time in, and is a very prominent ambassador of, San Miguel de Allende, Mexico, the proclaimed spiritual home of her Casa Dragones tequila brand. In March 2018, CNN Travel featured her in "Tequila maker's tour of San Miguel de Allende," a visual guide to the town's heritage, hot spots, and culinary renaissance.

She has been featured in full page-articles in top publications worldwide, including El Universal, Harper's Bazaar, and Blackbook.

In May 2010, she was featured in LA Times Magazine and praised for “bolstering the top-tier-tequila movement,” and was dubbed the “First Lady of Tequila.”

On December 17, 2009, González Nieves appeared on The Martha Stewart Show  and demonstrated how to correctly taste Casa Dragones tequila.

On November 29, 2010 CNN's premier food blog Eatocracy.com featured a spotlight on Bertha's tequila knowledge in a round up of “Five Things You Should Look For in a Great Tequila: Bertha González Nieves.”

In November 2010, González Nieves received the prestigious French luxury design award, Grand Prix Strategies de Luxe, for the product design of Casa Dragones and by 2013, DuJour Magazine called González, "the personification of Mexican business acumen.”

In 2018, she was named by Forbes as one of Mexico's 100 most powerful women of the year.

In July 2018, Food & Wine En Español named Bertha González Nieves as one of the most successful women in the world of Latin American gastronomy in a special story highlighting the region's gastronomy movement.  Also in 2018, Robb Report dedicated an article to her and the brand, noting Casa Dragones as a spirits brand that is taking tequila to the next level.

She was also featured in a special segment of the Today Show called "Leading the way," where they refer to González as tequila's rising star entrepreneur and shared her journey in creating Casa Dragones.

In 2020 she was selected to participate in the 2020 Marie Claire Power Trip, an invite only networking trip for female founders and executives.

Bertha González Nieves is a regular guest professor at the Universidad Autonoma de Guadalajara (UAG) teaching the university's first course on tequila, Tecnico Tequilero. The course focuses on the history and importance of tequila, federal governmental regulations surrounding tequila production, quality control, and the commercialization of tequila worldwide. The goal of this course is to continue to develop and evolve the tequila category, and inspire new generations of tequila producers.

Past
Prior to co-founding Tequila Casa Dragones, González Nieves spent over ten years as a top executive for Grupo Jose Cuervo, the largest tequila company in the world, and one of the top ten global spirits. While at the company she held senior marketing and commercial positions, including Commercial Director for North America, Global Director of New Business and Innovation and Global Brand Director. González Nieves was also instrumental in establishing the company's global team in New York, and played a key role in the recent upsurge and popularity of the Tequila category in the US and worldwide.

Prior to her position at Jose Cuervo, Ms. González Nieves served as a consultant at Booz Allen & Hamilton, where she designed and implemented marketing strategies for leading global packaged goods companies.

Entrepreneurial spirit
In addition to her work in marketing, González Nieves has taken on several side projects. In 2006, she helped launch Revista DF, Mexico's City Magazine, an Editorial Mapas publication.	

She also was one of the producers of the feature film Matando Cabos, which was an official selection at the Sundance Film Festival in 2005.

Education
González Nieves graduated magna cum laude from Universidad Anáhuac in Mexico City with a BA in Business Administration. She also holds a Masters of Science degree in Integrated Marketing Communications from the Medill School of Journalism & J.L. Kellogg Graduate School of Management at Northwestern University. She received the ‘Arthur E. Tatham Award’ for exceptional performance and outstanding promise in the field of marketing communications.

References

1970 births
Living people
American women in business
Mexican company founders
21st-century Mexican businesswomen
21st-century Mexican businesspeople
Mexican emigrants to the United States
American business executives
People from Mexico City
Medill School of Journalism alumni
Kellogg School of Management alumni
21st-century American women